The 1980 Cork Junior Hurling Championship was the 83rd staging of the Cork Junior Hurling Championship since its establishment by the Cork County Board. The championship ran from 28 September to 16 November 1980.

On 16 November 1980, Newcestown won the championship following a 1–12 to 2–06 defeat of Kilworth in the final at Páirc Uí Chaoimh. This was their second championship title overall and their first title since 1972.

Newcestown's Tim Crowley was the championship's top scorer with 2-19.

Results

Quarter-finals

Semi-finals

Final

Championship statistics

Top scorers

Overall

In a single game

References

Cork Junior Hurling Championship
Cork Junior Hurling Championship